Bayu may refer to:
Bayu, California
Bayu (state constituency)